Simon Gore (born 1988) is a Welsh guitarist, keyboarder, composer, and audio/visual artist.

Works 
 2016: White Film a new soundtrack to 1978 super 8 short art film by Joseph Bernard (Nonfigurativ Musikk) by permission
 2016: Origami Reinkarnasjon is a live only, hardware, AV performance collaboration Jack Rees
 2016: HouseMADE sound art featured a series of site specific works made by 12 artists over the course of two weeks in response to the idea of home and house, hosted and curated by Zoë Gingel
 2016: ÉN TI an audio/visual project depicting my interpretation of Nordic landscapes
 2017: Walls multi-sensory, audio/visual collaborative installation by Zoë Gingell and Simon Gore. It is presented as Zoë’s Creative Wales award piece
 2017: Enthusiasm, segments from a 1931 film with a live score

References

External links 

Welsh guitarists
Welsh artists
1988 births
Living people